The Institute of Mathematics of National Academy of Sciences of Armenia is owned and operated by the Armenian Academy of Sciences, located in Yerevan.

History
The Institute of Mathematics of National Academy of Sciences of Armenia originated as the Section for Mathematics and Mechanics, created within the newly formed Armenian Academy of Sciences in 1944. The section later developed into an Institute of Mathematics and Mechanics of the Armenian Academy of Sciences, whose first Director was academician Artashes Shahinian, known for his results in complex analysis. The Institute of Mathematics of Armenian Academy of Sciences separated from the latter Institute in 1971. The bearer of the office of the Director of Institute has been academician Mkhitar Djrbashian (1971-1989, 1989-1994 Honorary Director).

The academicians Sergey Mergelyan, Norair Arakelian, Alexandr Talalyan, Raphayel Alexandrian, Rouben V. Ambartzumian and Anry Nersesyan also have greatly influenced the formation of the scientific profile of the Institute and largely contributed to mathematics in general. In particular Rouben V. Ambartzumian is famous for his work in Stochastic Geometry and Integral Geometry, where he created a new branch called Combinatorial Integral Geometry. He has provided solutions to a number of classical problems in particular the solution to the Buffon Sylvester problem as well as the Hilbert's fourth problem in dimensions 2 and 3.

In the early years, the investigations carried out in the Institute concentrated on Function Theory. Gradually the sphere of investigations expanded and now includes Differential and Integral Equations, Functional Analysis, Probability Theory and Mathematical Statistics.

Journals
The institute has a journal, Izvestia NAS RA Matematika. The founder and the first Editor in Chief (1971–1990) of the journal was Mkhitar Djrbashian; under Rouben V. Ambartzumian Editor in Chief (1990 - 2010) the journal obtained international recognition and obtained an English version, Journal of Contemporary Mathematical Analysis, published initially by Allerton Press, Inc. New York and later by Springer Science+Business Media. Journal covers a host of topics including: real analysis and complex analysis; approximation theory, boundary value problems; integral geometry and stochastic geometry; differential equations; probability and statistics; integral equations; algebra.

Directors, faculty and members
At present the Institute has about 30 main researchers as well as a number of associate researchers from Yerevan State University.

Norair Arakelian in 1970 (Nice) and Mkhitar Djrbashian, Rouben V. Ambartzumian in 1974 (Vancouver) were invited speakers at the International Congresses of Mathematicians.

See also

 Armenian National Academy of Sciences
 Byurakan Observatory
 Education in Armenia
 List of International Congresses of Mathematicians Plenary and Invited Speakers
 Mikael Ter-Mikaelian Institute for Physical Research
 Science and technology in Armenia
 USSR State Prize
 Rollo Davidson Prize

References

External links
 Institute of Mathematics of National Academy of Sciences of Armenia official site
 National Academy of Sciences of Armenia

1944 establishments in Armenia
Science and technology in Armenia
Research institutes in Armenia
Mathematical institutes
Integral geometry
Research institutes in the Soviet Union